The 1930–31 Luxembourg National Division was the 21st season of top level association football in Luxembourg.

Overview
It was contested by eight teams, and FA Red Boys Differdange won the championship.

League standings

Results

References
Luxembourg - List of final tables (RSSSF)

Luxembourg National Division seasons
Lux
Nat